Giacomo Gattuso (born 14 June 1968) is an Italian professional football manager and a former player, recently in charge as head coach of Serie B club Como.

Career

Playing career
Gattuso's playing career has been mostly associated with hometown club Como, with whom he played up to Serie B level. He also played at Serie B level for Salernitana.

Coaching career
Following his retirement as an active player, Gattuso stayed at amateur side Canzese, his final club as a footballer, as their head coach.

He successively joined Novara's coaching staff, and also serving short stints as head coach between 2004 and 2005. He then joined then-Serie D club as their new head coach for the 2005–2006 season before returning to Novara as a youth coach.

In 2012 he was named co-head coach (together with Carlo Perrone) of Novara before being moved back in charge of the Under-19 team weeks later due to poor results. He also served once again as Novara head coach in 2014 on the relegation playoff second leg against Varese.

In June 2020 he returned to Como as an assistant coach, being promoted as head coach in December 2020 following the dismissal of Marco Banchini. Under his tenure, Como's results improved considerably, with the club ending the season as Serie C Group A winners, thus achieving promotion to Serie B.

After guiding Como throughout the 2021–22 Serie B campaign, Gattuso was confirmed in charge for the 2022–23 season, but was shortly afterwards forced to relinquish his working duties at the club due to health issues. On 8 September 2022, Como formally announced Gattuso was in need of an extended leave of absence, and therefore they were considering hiring a new head coach as a replacement. On 20 September 2022, Gattuso was formally replaced by Moreno Longo as permanent head coach.

References

1968 births
Living people
Italian footballers
Serie B players
Como 1907 players
Italian football managers
Serie B managers
Association football midfielders